Svetlana Ražnatović ( Veličković; ; ; born 14 June 1973), better known by her stage name Ceca, is a Serbian singer. Nicknamed the "Serbian mother", she is recognized as one of the most popular pop-folk singers in Serbia and Balkan, having sold seven million records. She is the widow of Željko "Arkan" Ražnatović, a career criminal and paramilitary commander in the Yugoslav Wars. During her Poziv Tour in 2013, she held a concert in Belgrade with over 150,000 attendants, making it one of the highest-attended concerts in the world.

Early life
Svetlana Veličković was born on 14 June 1973 in Prokuplje to Mira and Slobodan Veličković. She grew up in the nearby village of Žitorađa. Ceca has a younger sister named Lidija. Veličković graduated from the high school of agriculture, studying pig farming.

Career
While vacationing with her family on the coast of Montenegro as a teenager, Ražnatović was discovered by the prominent accordion instrumentalist Mirko Kodić, who helped her to pursue a recording career. Ceca made her debut in 1988 with the release of Cvetak zanovetak through PGP-RTB. The album's title song was presented at the Ilidža Folk Music Festival, where it received an award. Following the release of the three succeeding albums, which saw moderate success, Ceca gained more significant popularity when she began working with the songwriting duo Marina Tucaković and Milan Radulović on her fifth album Šta je to u tvojim venama. Released in 1993 under Juvekomerc, the album featured the stand-out hit "Kukavica". The record was promoted with Ceca's first solo concert, held in Belgrade's Tašmajdan Center. Šta je to u tvojim venama was followed by the albums Ja još spavam u tvojoj majici (1994) and Fatalna ljubav (1996), which included hits like "Volela sam te", "Nije monotoija", "Idi dok si mlad", "Tražio si sve" and "Beograd". In 1996, Ceca performed in Hala Pionir. Ražnatović also starred as Koštana in the 1996 film adaptation of Borisav Stanković's novel Impure Blood, but was eventually cut out from the picture due to poor critical reception. Her scenes were eventually featured on the television series Tajne nečiste krvi, which broadcast in the beginning of 2012. In 1997, she released Maskarada and in 1999, Ceca 2000. These records produced popular songs "Maskarada", "Nevaljala" and "Crveno".

After the release of Decenija (2001) through Grand Production, on 15 June 2002, Ražnatović performed at the Marakana Stadium in Belgrade to 70.000 people. Decenija was succeeded by Gore od ljubavi in May 2004 and Idealno loša in June 2006. On 17 June 2006, Ceca held a concert in Belgrade's Ušće Park. Album Ljubav živi was subsequently released in June 2011. It was followed by her fifteenth album Poziv in June 2013, released under City Records. It spawned hit songs like "Da raskinem sa njom", "Ime i prezime" and "Turbolentno". To promote the album, on Vidovdan 2013, Ražnatović held her second concert in Ušće Park. According to Ceca's management Ušće 2 attracted 150,000 people, making it one of the highest-attended concerts by a solo artist in the world. Same year, Ceca also performed at the New Year's Eve concert in front of the House of the National Assembly in Belgrade. In June 2016, she released the album Autogram, featuring songs like the title track, "Trepni" and "Metar odavde".

She has served as a judge on the singing competitions Pinkove Zvezde (2014–2016) and Zvezde Granda (2021–present). In October 2022, Ceca's reality show, titled Ceca Show: Ceca i deca, also began airing on Blic TV.

Personal life
In 1993, Ceca was introduced by singer Oliver Mandić to career criminal and paramilitary commander in the Yugoslav Wars, Željko "Arkan" Ražnatović, while performing for the soldiers at a military camp in Erdut. They got married on 19 February 1995. Their wedding, which was broadcast internationally, was portrayed as the "Serbian fairytale" by the local media. The couple has two children, Veljko (born 1996) and Anastasija (born 1998). Arkan was assassinated on 15 January 2000.

Legal issues
Following the assassination of Prime Minister Zoran Đinđić in March 2003, Ražnatović was arrested under suspicion of harboring the  leaders of the Zemun Clan in her house, and subsequently spent 121 days in commitment. Due to lack of evidence she was ultimately released of the charge, but was suspected of illegal firearm possession and embezzlement from transfers of her husband's football club, FK Obilić, between 2000 and 2003.

After eight years of investigation, in March 2011, a criminal charge was filled against Ražnatović by Serbian state prosecutors under suspicion of illegal appropriation of 4 million Deutsche Marks and over 3 million dollars from FK Obilić player transfers, as well as for illegal possession of 11 machine guns. Ceca, who took over the club after Arkan's murder, had argued that the deals were maintained by her late husband, and that the guns also belonged to him. In June 2011, Ražnatović, who had pleaded guilty, was charged for embezzlement and illegal firearm possession, and sentenced with €1,5 million fine and to a year in house arrest. She finished serving her detention, which was eventually reduced to eight months, in late February the following year.

Moreover, due to her past legal issues, Ražnatović is officially banned from entering Croatia, being proclaimed persona non grata.

Politics
Ceca was involved in politics by serving as the honorary president of the Party of Serbian Unity before Arkan was assassinated. Following her husband's death, she has kept relationships with Serbian politicians Ivica Dačić, who was also born in Žitorađa, and Dragan Marković, who was Arkan's former business associate. Ražnatović has publicly endorsed Aleksandar Vučić since the 2017 Serbian presidential election. In January 2019, Ražnatović, alongside President Vučić, representatives of the Serbian Government and Patriarch Irinej, was at the official welcoming party for Vladimir Putin at the plateau of Church of Saint Sava. 

Ražnatović has also maintained close ties with Bosnian Serb politician Milorad Dodik and has publicly endorsed him and his party SNSD. In June 2021, according to the reports of Insajder, Ceca was flown in by the Government-owned helicopter from Belgrade to Dodik's hometown of Laktaši in Republika Srpska to attend a private wedding party.

Discography

 Cvetak zanovetak (1988)
 Ludo srce (1989)
 Pustite me da ga vidim (1990)
 Babaroga (1991)
 Šta je to u tvojim venama (1993)
 Ja još spavam u tvojoj majici (1994)
 Fatalna ljubav (1995)
 Emotivna luda (1996)
 Maskarada (1997)
 Ceca 2000 (1999)
 Decenija (2001)
 Gore od ljubavi (2004)
 Idealno loša (2006)
 Ljubav živi (2011)
 Poziv (2013)
 Autogram (2016)

Filmography

Tours 

 Šta je to u tvojim venama Tour (1993)
 Ceca Tour '94 (1994)
 Fatalna ljubav Tour (1995)
 Decenija Tour (2002)
 Ceca Tour '05 (2005)
 Grom Tour (2006-10)
 Ljubav živi World Tour (2012-13)
 Poziv Tour (2013-16)
 Autogram Tour (2016-20)
 The best of Ceca Tour (2021)

References

External links

 Official website (partial archive)
 
 
 "Arkan & Me", The Observer interview dated 4 January 2004

1973 births
Living people
People from Žitorađa
20th-century Serbian women singers
21st-century Serbian women singers
Serbian turbo-folk singers
Serbian folk-pop singers